Claus Manniche (born June 21, 1956) is a Danish rheumatologist, Consultant and Professor.
His main research interests are clinical databases in back pain and research methodology. He has authored more than 120 journal articles and co-authored several books.

Life and career 
Claus Manniche was born in Kalundborg, Denmark. He studied medicine at the University of Copenhagen, graduating in 1982 and gained his license to practice in 1985. After gaining a law degree in 1988, he focused on the field of back pain and rheumatology, becoming a specialist Doctor in the latter area in 1994. In 1998 Claus Manniche was appointed as Professor and Director of the Spine Center of Southern Denmark.

Professor Manniche has been a part of several influential committees and research groups including the Danish Rheumatology Society, the Copenhagen Back Research Association and was more recently appointed by the Minister of Health as a member of a specialist committee investigating the prevention of back problems.

Claus Manniche has been the recipient of the Scandinavian Journal of Rheumatology's 40th Nordic Anniversary Prize in 1995. Two clinics that Professor Manniche developed have also been recognized: the outpatient back clinic at Aarhus County Hospital (Denmark) received the 'Quality Award for the year 1996, Aarhus Amt'; the Back Center at Fyn was a recipient of the Danish Chiropractors' Association honorary award in 2008.

Research 
Published in The Lancet 1988 one of the first randomized studies demonstrating convincing effects of exercise therapy in nonspecific back pain patients. This paper was groundbreaking regarding active spine rehabilitation worldwide. Developed a method for registration of pain and distinction between different types of pain: Low Back Pain Rating Scale, which is still used in research projects around the world. Has contributed to the discovery of the so-called Modic changes.

References

1956 births
Danish rheumatologists
Living people
People from Kalundborg